Mordellistena freyi is a species of beetle in the family Mordellidae. It is in the genus Mordellistena. The date of discovery is unknown.

References

freyi